Gohandra is a village in Anuppur district of Madhya Pradesh, India.

See also 
 Anuppur district

References 

Villages in Anuppur district